EHB may refer to:

 Extraordinary Human Being, in the town of Nafplio in Greece
 Erasmushogeschool Brussel, a university in Belgium
 Essential health benefits in the United States
 Extra Half-Brite, a screen mode of the Amiga micro computer
 The Kingdom of Ehb in the computer game Dungeon Siege
 Egér Hosszú Béllel